Store Street is a street in Bloomsbury, London.

Location

Store Street runs between Gower Street and Tottenham Court Road. It is joined by Ridgmount Street on its north side. Store Street runs parallel with Chenies Street and Alfred Place joins the two. South Crescent is on the south side of Store Street which mirrors North Crescent on the north side of Chenies Street.

Buildings

The street is made up mainly of offices with a parade of small shops on the south side between the eastern end of South Crescent and Gower Street. It also houses The University of Law's London Bloomsbury campus.

The former Bloomsbury Petrol Station on the corner of Ridgmount Street was subject to an award-winning redevelopment.

The Store Street Music Hall was once located at number 16.

Inhabitants
Mary Wollstonecroft (1759-1797) lived in Store Street in 1837 while writing her pioneering A Vindication of the Rights of Woman (1792).

Thomas King (1730–1805), actor and theatrical impresario, died at his home in New Store Street in 1805.

Dr. Crippen lived at 34-37 Store St before moving to 39 Hilldrop Crescent where he murdered his wife.

References

External links

Streets in the London Borough of Camden